9 Pashons - Coptic calendar - 11 Pashons

Fixed commemorations
All fixed commemorations below are observed on 10 Pashons (18 May) by the Coptic Orthodox Church.

Saints
The three youths Shadrach, Meshack, and Abednego

References
Coptic Synexarion

 Days of the Coptic calendar